Collisionless may refer to:

In information theory and computer science, computer networking architectures where collisions between packets of data cannot occur
In computer science, situations where collisions, or occurrences of the same value, cannot occur in a structure (and prevent reliable lookups)
In cosmology and physics, a medium in which the interaction cross-section between particles is so low that collisions between particles have no significant effect on the system. See Shock waves in astrophysics.